The Trimble ASCII Interface Protocol is a digital communication interface which uses printable ASCII characters over a serial link. It is used to communicate with Global Positioning System receivers.

See also 
 NMEA 0183
 NMEA 2000

References

Interfaces
Logical communication interfaces
Serial digital interface
Digital communication interfaces